Louis III of Châtillon (died 1372), son of Louis II, Count of Blois and Jeanne of Hainault,  was count of Blois and lord of Avesnes 1346–1372, and count of Soissons 1346–1367.

After the Battle of Poitiers, he had to send his brother Guy as a hostage to London, and ultimately sold Soissons to Enguerrand VII de Coucy to ransom him.

External links
 Counts of Blois

Chatillon, Louis II of
Louis III
Louis III
Year of birth unknown